Melissa Hayden (born Mildred Herman, April 25, 1923, Toronto; died August 9, 2006, Winston-Salem, North Carolina) was a Canadian ballerina at the New York City Ballet.

Early life
Hayden was born in Toronto as the second daughter of Jacob Herman and his wife Kate Weinberg, Jewish immigrants from Russia. The young Mildred was called Millie at home, a nickname she kept for the rest of her life.

Career
In the early 1940s, she moved to New York City to join the ballet corps at Radio City Music Hall. From 1945 to 1947, she was a member of the American Ballet Theatre; she joined the New York City Ballet shortly after its founding in 1948.  She performed there many times with dancer Jacques d'Amboise. From 1955 until her retirement in 1973, Hayden was a principal dancer of the New York City Ballet.

Film and television
Hayden appeared frequently on television, especially The Kate Smith Show and The Ed Sullivan Show.  In 1952 she performed as the dance double for Claire Bloom in the film Limelight.

In 1965, she was seen on American television as the Sugar Plum Fairy in a one-hour German-American adaptation of The Nutcracker. Filmed in 1964 and first shown in the United States by CBS just four days before Christmas 1965, the production, with a heavily altered storyline, featured an international cast of dancers and English narration by Eddie Albert. Edward Villella and Patricia McBride also starred.

Retirement

After appearing in over 60 ballets, mainly works by George Balanchine, Hayden retired as a dancer in 1973.  Balanchine honored her on her retirement by creating the ballet "Cortege Hongrois".  At the premiere of the piece, Mayor John Lindsay presented Hayden with the city's Handel Medallion, praising her as an "extraordinary ballerina who has filled the hearts of her audience with joy".

After her retirement, she became head of the ballet department at Skidmore College, and taught ballet at the School of Pacific Northwest Ballet in Seattle, and in New York City, where she opened her own school. From 1983 until just a month before her death, she taught at the North Carolina School of the Arts in Winston-Salem, where she stressed the importance of the Balanchine technique. She rehearsed and staged some of Balanchine's most demanding works including Concerto Barocco, and the masterful Theme & Variations.

Marriage and children
Hayden married lawyer-businessman Donald Coleman. The couple had two children. Hayden died at her home in Winston-Salem of pancreatic cancer, aged 83.

Published works
Hayden was also an author of several books:  
 Melissa Hayden, Offstage and On (1963)
 Ballet Exercises for Figure, Grace & Beauty (1969)
 Dancer to Dancer: Advice for Today's Dancer (1981) 
 The Nutcracker Ballet, illustrated by Stephen Johnson (1992)

References

Bibliography
 Gustaitis, Rasa: Melissa Hayden Ballerina. Nelson. 1967.

1923 births
2006 deaths
Deaths from cancer in North Carolina
Canadian expatriates in the United States
Canadian people of Russian-Jewish descent
Canadian Jews
Jewish dancers
Canadian ballerinas
Canadian female dancers
Deaths from pancreatic cancer
New York City Ballet principal dancers
People from Toronto